The Chief Secretary for Ireland was a key political office in the British administration in Ireland.  Nominally subordinate to the Lord Lieutenant, and officially the "Chief Secretary to the Lord Lieutenant", from the early 19th century until the end of British rule he was effectively the government minister with responsibility for governing Ireland, roughly equivalent to the role of a Secretary of State, such as the similar role of Secretary of State for Scotland. Usually it was the Chief Secretary, rather than the Lord Lieutenant, who sat in the British Cabinet. The Chief Secretary was ex officio President of the Local Government Board for Ireland from its creation in 1872.

British rule over much of Ireland came to an end as the result of the Irish War of Independence, which culminated in the establishment of the Irish Free State.  In consequence the office of Chief Secretary was abolished, as well as that of Lord Lieutenant.  Executive responsibility within the Irish Free State and Northern Ireland was effectively transferred to the President of the Executive Council (i.e. the prime minister) and the Prime Minister of Northern Ireland respectively.

History of the office

The dominant position of the Lord Lieutenant at Dublin Castle had been central to the British administration of the Kingdom of Ireland for much of its history. Poynings' Law in particular meant that the Parliament of Ireland lacked an independent power of legislation, and the Crown kept control of executive authority in the hands of the Lord Lieutenant and its own appointees, rather than in the hands of ministers responsible to the Irish parliament.

In 1560, Queen Elizabeth I of England and Ireland ordered the Lord Lieutenant, the Earl of Sussex, to appoint John Challoner of Dublin as Secretary of State for Ireland "because at this present there is none appointed to be Clerk of our Council there, and considering how more meet it were, that in our realm there were for our honour one to be our Secretary there for the affairs of our Realm". The appointment of a Secretary was intended to both improve Irish administration, and to keep the Lord Lieutenant in line. The role of Secretary of State for Ireland and Chief Secretary of Ireland were originally distinct positions, Thomas Pelham being the first individual appointed to both offices concurrently in 1796.

Over time, the post of Chief Secretary gradually increased in importance, particularly because of his role as manager of legislative business for the Government in the Irish House of Commons, in which he sat as an MP. While the Irish administration was not responsible to the parliament, it nevertheless needed to manage and influence it in order to ensure the passage of legislation.

Chief Secretary Viscount Castlereagh played a key role in the enactment of the Act of Union which passed in the Irish Parliament on its second attempt in 1800 through the exercise of patronage and direct bribery. Upon the Union on 1 January 1801, the Kingdom of Ireland was merged into the United Kingdom of Great Britain and Ireland and the Irish parliament ceased to exist. However, the existing system of administration in Ireland continued broadly in place, with the offices of Lord Lieutenant and Chief Secretary retaining their respective roles.

The last Chief Secretary to represent an Irish constituency while in office was Chichester Parkinson-Fortescue, MP for County Louth, who served from 1868 to 1871.

The last Chief Secretary was Sir Hamar Greenwood, who left office in October 1922. The Irish Free State, comprising the greater part of Ireland, would become independent on 6 December 1922. In Northern Ireland, a new Government of Northern Ireland was established, with a Prime Minister of Northern Ireland. This government was suspended in 1972, and the position of Secretary of State for Northern Ireland was created as a position in the British cabinet.

List of chief secretaries for Ireland
This list includes holders of a key political office in the British administration in Ireland.  Nominally subordinate to the Lord Lieutenant, from the late 18th century until the end of British rule he was effectively the government minister with responsibility for governing Ireland; usually it was the Chief Secretary, rather than the Lord Lieutenant, who sat in the British Cabinet. Exceptions were the periods from 29 June 1895 to 8 August 1902, when the Lord Lieutenant Lord Cadogan sat in the Cabinet and the Chief Secretaries Gerald Balfour until 9 November 1900 did not sit there and George Wyndham from that date also sat there, and from 28 October 1918 to 2 April 1921, when both the Lord Lieutenant Lord French and the Chief Secretaries Edward Shortt, Ian Macpherson and Sir Hamar Greenwood sat in the Cabinet.

Kingdom of Ireland

United Kingdom

See also
 Secretary of State for Northern Ireland, similar position in the British cabinet from 1972.

References

Bibliography
 British Historical Facts 1760–1830, by Chris Cook and John Stevenson (The Macmillan Press 1980)  (includes list of Chief Secretaries on page 31)
 British Historical Facts 1830–1900, by Chris Cook and Brendan Keith (The Macmillan Press 1975)  (includes list of Chief Secretaries on pages 52–53)
 Twentieth-Century British Political Facts 1900–2000, by David Butler and Gareth Butler (Macmillan Press, Eighth edition 2000)  paperback (includes list of Chief Secretaries on page 61)

Early Modern Ireland
Political office-holders in pre-partition Ireland
Irish heads of government
Ireland
Chief Secretaries for Ireland
History of Ireland (1801–1923)